Mélanie Ougier (born 11 May 1984) is a French former luger. She competed in the women's singles event at the 2002 Winter Olympics.

References

External links
 

1984 births
Living people
French female lugers
Olympic lugers of France
Lugers at the 2002 Winter Olympics
People from Bourg-Saint-Maurice
Sportspeople from Savoie